誰にも渡せないよ (Darenimo Watasenai Yo) is the fifth Japanese single (counted as fourth) by the South Korean boy band 2AM. It was released in December 5, 2012 in three different editions.

This title track is their second original Japanese single.

Track listing

References

External links 
 Official Website
 Japanese Official Website

2012 singles
2012 songs
Ariola Japan singles